Nawanagar was an Indian princely state in the historical Halar region, located on the southern shores of the Gulf of Kutch. It was ruled by the Jadeja Rajput dynasty and became the part of newly formed India. The city is now known as Jamnagar. Its rulers, who use the title of "Jam Saheb" are of the same clan as the Rao of Kutch. They were entitled to a 13-gun salute. The state flag was a rectangular red flag with a white elephant, near and facing the hoist. During the British, the state was part of the Kathiawar Agency,  within the Gujarat Division of Bombay Presidency.

The state had a pearl fishery and much of its wealth came from this. Nawanagar is also famous for its late ruler Jam Saheb Ranjitsinhji (died 1933), who was a famous cricket player at Cambridge in England before his accession to the throne.

History
Nawanagar was founded in 1540 by Jam Sri Rawalji, a descendant of the Jadeja ruler of Kutch, and was thereafter in an almost constant state of war with its neighbours and with the Mughal Empire. Two such major wars were the Battle of Mithoi and Battle of Bhuchar Mori fought in 1591. The "Walker Treaty of 1807" brought peace to the Kathiawar states for the first time in several generations. Nawanagar came under British protection on 22 February 1812.

K. S. Ranjitsinhji was one of the world's greatest cricket players and, later, became Jam Saheb in 1907 until 1933. The inclusive  circle of eight players promoted excellence in cricket, both in the county and domestic games. After his death, Ranji Trophy, a domestic first-class cricket championship played in India between different city and state sides, was started in 1934 by Board of Control for Cricket in India (BCCI).

Jam Saheb Shri Sir Ranjitsinhji remained the chancellor of the Chamber of Princes (1931–1933).  After his death, in 1933, he was succeeded by his nephew Jam Saheb Shri Sir Digvijaysinhji, who  became its chancellor (1937–1944) and continued to promote the octet circle in excellence in cricket, academics and welfare. In 1942 the Maharaja set up a refugee camp for Polish children in Balachadi.

Nawanagar was one of the first princely states to sign the Instrument of Accession in 1948 after Indian independence. Afterwards, the late ruler, Digvijaysinhji, served as the first Rajpramukh of Kathiawad, then represented his country at the United Nations.

In 1949, the princely states of Nawanagar and Dhrol, Jalia Dewani in Kathiawar merged into the new state of Saurashtra. On 19 June 1959, the boundaries of the district were enlarged by the inclusion of the adjoining Okhamandal, and the district was renamed Jamnagar. This district became part of the new state of Gujarat on the division of the State of Bombay on 1 May 1960.

Rulers (Jam Saheb)

Jewellery collection
The Maharaja Jamsaheb of Nawanagar were also known for their jewellery collection; especially Ranjithsinhji, whose Emerald collection according to Jacques Cartier was "unequaled in the world, if not in quantity, then certainly in quality". The collection included an emerald and pearl necklace, an art deco emerald and diamond necklace designed by Jacques Cartier and an Emerald collar or choker also designed by Jacques Cartier.

The  61.5 carat (12.3 g) whisky-coloured diamond, "The Eye of the Tiger", was mounted by Cartier in a turban aigrette for the JMaharaja or Maharaja of Nawanagar in 1934.

See also
Nawanagar cricket team
Political integration of India
Western India States Agency
Jam Sahib
Jamnagar & Dwarka Railway

References

External links

 
Saurashtra (region)
Historical Hindu kingdoms
Princely states of Gujarat
1540 establishments in India
Rajputs
Jadejas
States and territories established in 1540
Rajput clans of Gujarat
States and territories disestablished in 1948
1948 disestablishments in India